ONE Friday Fights 6: Gingsanglek vs. Kongthoranee (also known as ONE Lumpinee 6) was a combat sport event produced by ONE Championship that took place on February 24, 2023, at Lumpinee Boxing Stadium in Bangkok, Thailand.

Background
The preliminary card event live on FanDuel TV, prelim headlined by a bantamweight kickboxing bout between former ONE Flyweight Kickboxing World Champion Ilias Ennahachi and Aliasghar Ghodratisaraskan, main card live on YouTube and Facebook: ONE Championship, headlined by a flyweight muay thai bout between Gingsanglek Tor.Laksong and former Rajadamnern Stadium Super bantamweight and Lightweight champion Kongthoranee Sor.Sommai. The pairing first met at SuekJaoMuayThai in Omnoi Stadium on April 24, 2021, which Gingsanglek won by unanimous decision. Their second meeting took place at Amarin Super Fight: Chang Muay Thai Kiatpetch in Rajadamnern Stadium on March 20, 2022, which Kongthoranee won by TKO (doctor stoppage) in the round five.

A featherweight bout between Anzor Chakaev and Leonardo Casotti was scheduled for this event. However, Casotti stepped in to face Martin Nguyen at ONE Fight Night 7 on February 25 and the bout was cancelled.

Results

Bonus awards 
The following fighters received $10,000 bonuses.

Performance of the Night: Kongthoranee Sor.Sommai, Johan Ghazali, Bogdan Shumarov and Celest Hansen

See also 

 2023 in ONE Championship
 List of ONE Championship events
 List of current ONE fighters

References 

Events in Bangkok
ONE Championship events
2023 in mixed martial arts
Mixed martial arts in Thailand
Sports competitions in Thailand
February 2023 sports events in Thailand